"I Don't Wanna Take This Pain" is a single by Australian singer Dannii Minogue from her debut album, Love and Kisses (1991). A personal favourite of Minogue's, its original mix was released as the third single in Australia, where it peaked at number 92 on the ARIA Singles CHart December 1990. A re-recorded and remixed version of the song (by L.A. Mix) was released in the United Kingdom as the fifth and final single in December 1991 and received mostly positive reviews from music critics. "I Don't Wanna Take This Pain" reached number 40 in the UK.

Critical reception
In their review of the Love and Kisses album, Billboard wrote that songs like "I Don't Wanna Take This Pain" "surround her chirpy voice with contagious beats and melodies that should sound just dandy on top 40 radio." Rozalla Miller reviewed the song for Smash Hits, adding "...her voice sounds much better on this record than it does on her other ones. It's pretty good, but it's not as catchy as Baby Love."

Track listings
Australian cassingle
(C10129; Released in November 1990)
 "I Don't Wanna Take This Pain" (7-inch version)
 "Love Traffic"

Australian 7-inch vinyl single
(K10129; Released in November 1990)
 "I Don't Wanna Take This Pain" (7-inch version) – 3:23
 "Love Traffic"

Australian 12-inch vinyl single
(X14933; Released in November 1990)
 "I Don't Wanna Take This Pain" (extended mix)
 "I Don't Wanna Take This Pain" (instrumental)
 "Love Traffic" (album mix)

UK CD single
(MCSTD1600; Released on 2 December 1991)
 "I Don't Wanna Take This Pain" (L.A. Mix 7-inch version) – 3:23
 "I Don't Wanna Take This Pain" (12-inch version) – 6:04
 "Jump to the Beat" (12-inch version) – 6:42
 "Baby Love" (E Smooves 12-inch mix) – 6:38

Personnel
 Dannii Minogue – lead vocals
 Les Adams – L.A. Mix production
 Emma Freilich – L.A. Mix production
 Simon Fowler – photography

Charts

Release history

References

1990 singles
1990 songs
1991 singles
Dannii Minogue songs
MCA Records singles
Mushroom Records singles
Songs written by Dannii Minogue